Deux cents nuits à l'heure (Two Hundred Nights Per Hour) is a one-off collaborative album by Québec singer-songwriters Serge Fiori and Richard Séguin, released in 1978. Fiori had recently disbanded his earlier group, Harmonium, while Séguin's folk group, les Séguins (with his twin sister Marie-Claire), had also recently folded, leaving the two artists free to collaborate on this new project.

On Deux cents nuits à l'heure, Fiori and Séguin each contribute a pair of solo songs that they had been working on with their earlier bands, adding three songs that they co-wrote, which they sing as a duet. They are backed by the lineup of musicians that had performed and toured in support of Harmonium's L'Heptade (see Harmonium en tournée), all of whom contributed to the musical arrangements. Fiori's Viens Danser got wide FM airplay in Francophone countries, and the album sold 200,000 copies in total.

The album covers a wide range of styles and tempos, incorporating many of the sounds and stylings familiar to fans of Harmonium, including extensive use of six- and twelve-string acoustic guitar, flute and saxophone. Instead of the high concepts of Si on avait besoin d'une cinquième saison and L'Heptade, Harmonium's last two albums, Deux cents nuits à l'heure is more accessible. Allmusic critic François Couture states "this album brings to a gentle close the heyday of art rock in Québec."

The album won the Félix prize Album of the Year at the first ever Gala de l'ADISQ (sep.1979).

The album was released in CD format in 1991.

On March 28, 2018, Sony Music Canada announced a 40th anniversary reissue entitled: "Deux cents nuits à l'heure XL" to be released on May 11, 2018.  The album was remastered by Fiori and Séguin from a new transfer of the original tapes.  Both artists were reunited together in studio for the first time in forty years.

Track listing

Side one 
 "Deux cents nuits à l'heure" (Serge Fiori, Richard Séguin) – 8:22
 "Ça fait du bien" (Fiori, Séguin) – 8:31
 "Illusion" (Séguin) – 7:30

Side two 
 "Viens danser" (Fiori) – 6:04
 "Chanson pour Marthe" (Séguin) – 4:26
 "La Moitié du monde" (Fiori) - 6:34
 "La Guitare des Pays d'en Haut" (Fiori, Séguin) - 6:14

The instrumental half of La Guitare des Pays d'en Haut was originally the 2nd half of "Viens danser" on an older recording made as Harmonium in 1978, but released only in 1990 as the movie Harmonium en Californie (NFB).

Personnel
Serge Fiori – guitar, Fender Rhodes piano, tambourine, lead vocals
Richard Séguin – guitar, lead vocals
Neil Chotem – electric piano
Michel Dion – electric bass
Denis Farmer – drums, tambourine
Monique Fauteux - vocals (4 tracks)
Libert Subirana - flutes, saxophones (6 tracks)
Jeff Fisher - keyboards (4 tracks)
Robert Stanley - electric guitar (5 tracks)
Pierre Cormier - congas (2 tracks)

References

1978 albums
Serge Fiori albums
Richard Séguin albums